Nicholas Kevin Stanley Yunge-Bateman (born November 18, 1986) is a Canadian model, actor and music producer.

Career

At a young age, Bateman began martial arts training in Gōjū-ryū karate and bō staff. In his teens Bateman won four world titles in the National Blackbelt League's 15-17 age division, with three in weapons as well as one in Japanese forms in Houston and Myrtle Beach in 2003 and 2004   He graduated from Capilano University in Vancouver at age 20, and later  opened his own karate school. Shortly thereafter, he began modeling professionally, during which time he lived in Milan, as well as New York City and Miami. He was once chosen for an Abercrombie & Fitch Campaign, which was photographed by Bruce Weber.

Bateman is also a film and television actor and starred in the 2011 film Hobo with a Shotgun, he also starred in the 2019 Hallmark Channel television film A Brush With Love where he played the male lead opposite actress Arielle Kebbel. His last acting role was starring in the 2021 GAC Family movie A Christmas Miracle for Daisy alongside Jill Wagner.

Personal life 
Bateman has two dogs, both Yorkies, named Joey and Keeva. He volunteered with PETA to bring hay and repair shelters for dogs kept outside in North Carolina. 

Bateman began dating Maria Corrigan in July 2008. They married in 2019 and have two sons.

Filmography

Awards

References

External links
 
 

1986 births
Canadian male film actors
Canadian male models
Canadian male television actors
Canadian male karateka
Living people
Canadian male web series actors
21st-century Canadian male actors
Capilano University alumni
Male actors from Ontario
Sportspeople from Burlington, Ontario
Canadian expatriate male actors in the United States